The Revelation of the Pyramids is a 
pseudo-scientific documentary directed by Patrice Pooyard and released in 2010, then widely disseminated on the Internet from 2012. Written by Patrice Pooyard and Jacques Grimault, the film highlights pseudo-historical theories put forward by the latter.

Description 
The film presents the view of Jacques Grimault's unpublished works about the construction of the Pyramids of Giza and other ancient archaeological sites around the world.

His main point is that there is a slow cycle of geological changes on Earth, including the change of the magnetic poles, which cause great catastrophes about every 26 000 years, and he believes there was another human civilisation before ours which was destroyed by such catastrophes. Pyramids and other ancient buildings were built by them, and the Pyramids of Giza were not primarily tombs, but rather a mathematical riddle, its answer being a warning of this cycle. Grimault views the current global warming as a forerunner of these catastrophic events.

Alignment of sites 
The film claims that the Giza pyramid complex are aligned on a "leaning equator" of 30 degrees from the traditional equator, along with other archaeological sites : Easter Island, Machu Picchu, Ollantaytambo, the Paracas civilization, the Dogon country and Mohenjo-daro, so as to be placed at equidistant from the magnetic poles of the earth, in the framework of theories that consider pyramids as generators of energy, among the many pseudo-scientific theories trying to revise the so-called official destination (places of worship, tombs) of pyramids.

Reception 
According to journalist Paul Conge, "Grimault implicitly uses a racial motif" behind his pseudoscientific theses and defends negationist theories.

The movie's poor scientific credulity was widely denounced by experts. Jacques Grimault did not accept the criticism and was charged in 2023 with harassment against a young archeology scholar.

References

External links
  

Works about ancient Egypt
Pyramids
2010 films
Films based on non-fiction books